No Guitars is an EP by the alternative rock band Helium. It was released in April 1997 on Matador Records.

Track listing

Personnel
Mary Timony - Guitar, Vocals
Ash Bowie - Bass
Shawn King Devlin - Drums
Mitch Easter - Producer, Engineer, Slide Guitar

References

1997 EPs
Matador Records EPs
Helium (band) albums